Babar Ali Khan (born 5 August 1963) is a Pakistani boxer. He competed in the men's bantamweight event at the 1984 Summer Olympics.

References

1963 births
Living people
Pakistani male boxers
Olympic boxers of Pakistan
Boxers at the 1984 Summer Olympics
Place of birth missing (living people)
Asian Games medalists in boxing
Boxers at the 1982 Asian Games
Asian Games silver medalists for Pakistan
Medalists at the 1982 Asian Games
Bantamweight boxers
20th-century Pakistani people